This is a list of viscountcies in Portugal

Note that some of the titles are only used as subsidiary titles.

This list does may include extinct, dormant, abeyant, forfeited or titles of which their holder is not known.

A

 Viscount of Abrançalha
 Viscount of Abrigada
 Viscount of Agarez
 Viscount of Agualva
 Viscount of Aguieira
 Viscount of Airey
 Viscount of Albergaria de Souto Redondo
 Viscount of Alcácer do Sal
 Viscount of Alcafache
 Viscount of Alcaide
 Viscount of Alcântara
 Viscount of Alcobaça
 Viscount of Alcochete
 Viscount of Alenquer
 Viscount of Alentém
 Viscount of Alferrarede
 Viscount of Algés
 Viscount of Alhandra
 Viscount of Alhos Vedros
 Viscount of Aljezur
 Viscount of Almeida
 Viscount of Almeida Araújo
 Viscount of Almeida e Vasconcelos
 Viscount of Almeida Garrett
 Viscount of Almeidinha
 Viscount of Almendra
 Viscount of Alpedriz
 Viscount of Alpendurada
 Viscount of Alpiarça
 Viscount of Altas Moras
 Viscount of Alte
 Viscount of Alter do Chão
 Viscount of Alto Dande
 Viscount of Alvalade
 Viscount of Alvelos
 Viscount of Alverca
 Viscount of Alves de Sá
 Viscount of Alves Machado
 Viscount of Alves Mateus
 Viscount of Alvor
 Viscount of Ameal
 Viscount of Amoreira da Torre
 Viscount of Amoroso Lima
 Viscount of Amparo
 Viscount of Anadia
 Viscount of Andaluz
 Viscount of Antas
 Viscount of Antunes Braga
 Viscount of Araújo
 Viscount of Arcas
 Viscount of Arcozelo
 Viscount of Ariz
 Viscount of Arneiro
 Viscount of Arneirós
 Viscount of Arriaga
 Viscount of Asseca
 Viscount of Asselin
 Viscount of Assentiz
 Viscount of Atouguia
 Viscount of Augusto Correia
 Viscount of Aurora
 Viscount of Avelar
 Viscount of Azarujinha
 Viscount of Azenha
 Viscount of Azevedo
 Viscount of Azevedo e Silva
 Viscount of Azevedo Ferreira
 Viscount of Azinheira
 Viscount of Azurara

B

 Viscount of Baçar
 Viscount of Bahía
 Viscount of Balsemão
 Viscount of Banho
 Viscount of Barbacena
 Viscount of Barcel
 Viscount of Barcelinhos
 Viscount of Bardez
 Viscount of Barreira
 Viscount of Barreiro
 Viscount of Barreiros
 Viscount of Barros Lima
 Viscount of Barrosa
 Viscount of Barroso
 Viscount of Bastos
 Viscount of Baux d'Aviette
 Viscount of Beire
 Viscount of Beirós
 Viscount of Bela Vista
 Viscount of Belfort
 Viscount of Belver
 Viscount of Benagazil
 Viscount of Benalcanfor
 Viscount of Benavente
 Viscount of Bertiandos
 Viscount of Bessone
 Viscount of Bettencourt
 Viscount of Bianchi
 Viscount of Bischoffsheim
 Viscount of Bivar
 Viscount of Boavista
 Viscount of Bóbeda
 Viscount of Bom Sucesso
 Viscount of Borges da Silva
 Viscount of Borges de Castro
 Viscount of Borralha
 Viscount of Botelho
 Viscount of Botelho de Seabra
 Viscount of Bouça
 Viscount of Bouzões
 Viscount of Bovieiro
 Viscount of Britiande
 Viscount of Bruges
 Viscount of Bucelas
 Viscount of Bustos

C

 Viscount of Cabo de Santa Maria
 Viscount of Cabo de São Vicente
 Viscount of Cabrela
 Viscount of Cacongo
 Viscount of Caetano Pinto
 Viscount of Calçada
 Viscount of Calhariz de Benfica
 Viscount of Camarate
 Viscount of Campanhã
 Viscount of Canas
 Viscount of Canelas
 Viscount of Cantim
 Viscount of Capelinha
 Viscount of Carcavelos
 Viscount of Cardoso da Silva
 Viscount of Caria
 Viscount of Carmo
 Viscount of Carnaxide
 Viscount of Carnide
 Viscount of Carregoso
 Viscount of Carreira
 Viscount of Carriche
 Viscount of Cartaxo
 Viscount of Carvalhais
 Viscount of Carvalhido
 Viscount of Carvalho
 Viscount of Carvalho Moreira
 Viscount of Casa Branca
 Viscount of Castanheira de Pera
 Viscount of Castedo
 Viscount of Castelo
 Viscount of Castelo Alvo
 Viscount of Castelo Branco
 Viscount of Castelo da Lousã
 Viscount of Castelo de Borges
 Viscount of Castelo Novo
 Viscount of Castelões
 Viscount of Castilho
 Viscount of Castro
 Viscount of Castro e Sola
 Viscount of Castro Guedes
 Viscount of Castro Guidão
 Viscount of Castro Silva
 Viscount of Cauípe
 Viscount of Cedofeita
 Viscount of Cercal
 Viscount of Chabert
 Viscount of Champalimaud-Duff
 Viscount of Chanceleiros
 Viscount of Charruada
 Viscount of Cidraes
 Viscount of Condeixa (I)
 Viscount of Condeixa (II)
 Viscount of Condeixa (III)
 Viscount of Coriscada
 Viscount of Correia Botelho
 Viscount of Correia Godinho
 Viscount of Córte
 Viscount of Cortegaça
 Viscount of Coruche
 Viscount of Corujeira
 Viscount of Costa
 Viscount of Costa Franco
 Viscount of Costa Veiga
 Viscount of Covilhã
 Viscount of Cruz Alta
 Viscount of Cunha Matos

D

 Viscount of Damão
 Viscount of Daupias
 Viscount of Degracias
 Viscount of Denfert-Rochereau
 Viscount of Desterro
 Viscount of Devezas
 Viscount of Dominguizo
 Viscount of Duprat
 Viscount of Dupuy d'Angeac

E

 Viscount of Ephrussi
 Viscount of Ermida
 Viscount of Ervedal
 Viscount of Ervedal da Beira
 Viscount of Ervedosa
 Viscount of Ervideira
 Viscount of Esperança
 Viscount of Espinhal
 Viscount of Espinhosa
 Viscount of Estói
 Viscount of Estrela
 Viscount of Estremoz

F

 Viscount of Falcarreira
 Viscount of Faria
 Viscount of Faria e Maia
 Viscount of Faria Machado
 Viscount of Faria Pinho
 Viscount of Faro
 Viscount of Faro e Oliveira
 Viscount of Feitosa
 Viscount of Ferreira
 Viscount of Ferreira Alves
 Viscount of Ferreira de Abreu
 Viscount of Ferreira de Almeida
 Viscount of Ferreira do Alentejo
 Viscount of Ferreira Lima
 Viscount of Ferreira Pinto
 Viscount of Ferreri
 Viscount of Ferrocinto
 Viscount of Fervença
 Viscount of Figanière
 Viscount of Figueiredo
 Viscount of Fijô
 Viscount of Fontainhas
 Viscount of Fonte Arcada
 Viscount of Fonte Boa
 Viscount of Fonte do Mato
 Viscount of Fonte Nova
 Viscount of Fornos de Algodres
 Viscount of Fouquier
 Viscount of Foz
 Viscount of Foz de Arouce
 Viscount of Fragosela
 Viscount of Fraião
 Viscount of Franco e Almodôvar
 Viscount of Francos
 Viscount of Freixo

G

 Viscount of Gama
 Viscount of Gameiro
 Viscount of Gândara
 Viscount of Gandarinha
 Viscount of Garcez
 Viscount of Gay
 Viscount of Gemunde
 Viscount of Geraz do Lima
 Viscount of Gerês
 Viscount of Gião
 Viscount of Giraúl
 Viscount of Girod
 Viscount of Godim
 Viscount of Goguel
 Viscount of Gomes Pinto
 Viscount of Gomiei
 Viscount of Gonçalves de Freitas
 Viscount of Gonçalves Pinto
 Viscount of Gondoriz
 Viscount of Gouveia
 Viscount of Graça
 Viscount of Graceira
 Viscount of Graciosa
 Viscount of Gramosa
 Viscount of Granja
 Viscount of Granja do Tedo
 Viscount of Granjão
 Viscount of Guedes
 Viscount of Guedes Teixeira
 Viscount of Guiães
 Viscount of Guilhofrei
 Viscount of Guilhomil
 Viscount of Guinfões

H

 Viscount of Hamilton
 Viscount of Horncastle

I

 Viscount of Idanha
 Viscount of Itacolumi
 Viscount of Itaguaí
 Viscount of Itaguí do Norte

J

 Viscount of Junqueira
 Viscount of Juromenha

L

 Viscount of Laborim
 Viscount of Lagoa
 Viscount of Lagoaça
 Viscount of Lagos
 Viscount of Lajeosa
 Viscount of Lançada
 Viscount of Lancastre
 Viscount of Landal
 Viscount of Lapa
 Viscount of Laranjeiras
 Viscount of Las Casas
 Viscount of Leceia
 Viscount of Leiria
 Viscount of Leite Perry
 Viscount of Lemos
 Viscount of Lengruber
 Viscount of Leopoldina
 Viscount of Lindoso
 Viscount of Lobão
 Viscount of Lobata
 Viscount of Loureiro
 Viscount of Loures
 Viscount of Lourinhã
 Viscount of Lousada
 Viscount of Luzares

M

 Viscount of Macedo de Cavaleiros
 Viscount of Macedo Pinto
 Viscount of Macieira
 Viscount of Magé
 Viscount of Mahem
 Viscount of Maiorca
 Viscount of Maiors
 Viscount of Malanza
 Viscount of Mangualde
 Viscount of Manique do Intendente
 Viscount of Marco
 Viscount of Margaride
 Viscount of Mariares
 Viscount of Marinha Grande
 Viscount of Marinho
 Viscount of Marmeleiro
 Viscount of Marzovelos
 Viscount of Mason de São Domingos
 Viscount of Massamá
 Viscount of Matalha
 Viscount of Mato
 Viscount of Mayrink
 Viscount of Meireles
 Viscount of Melício
 Viscount of Melo Barreto
 Viscount of Menezes
 Viscount of Merceana
 Viscount of Mesquitela
 Viscount of Messengil
 Viscount of Messines
 Viscount of Midões (1st)
 Viscount of Midões (2nd)
 Viscount of Milhundos
 Viscount of Mindelo
 Viscount of Mira Vouga
 Viscount of Miragaia
 Viscount of Miranda
 Viscount of Miranda do Corvo
 Viscount of Mirandela
 Viscount of Mogofores
 Viscount of Moimenta da Beira
 Viscount of Molelos
 Viscount of Monção
 Viscount of Monforte
 Viscount of Monsanto
 Viscount of Monsaraz
 Viscount of Monserrate
 Viscount of Montalegre
 Viscount of Montalvo
 Viscount of Montargil
 Viscount of Montariol
 Viscount of Monte Belo
 Viscount of Monte Redondo
 Viscount of Monte São
 Viscount of Montedor
 Viscount of Montjuïc
 Viscount of Morais
 Viscount of Morais Cardoso
 Viscount of Morais Sarmento
 Viscount of Morão
 Viscount of Moreira de Rei
 Viscount of Moser
 Viscount of Mossâmedes
 Viscount of Moura
 Viscount of Mozelos

N

 Viscount of Nandufe
 Viscount of Napier de São Vicente
 Viscount of Napóles e Lemos
 Viscount of Nazaré
 Viscount of Negrelos
 Viscount of Nevogilde
 Viscount of Nivert
 Viscount of Nogueiras
 Viscount of Noronha
 Viscount of Nossa Senhora da Luz
 Viscount of Nossa Senhora das Mercês
 Viscount of Nossa Senhora do Porto de Ave
 Viscount of Nova Granada
 Viscount of Nova Java

O

 Viscount of Odivelas
 Viscount of Ogorman
 Viscount of Oleiros
 Viscount of Olivã
 Viscount of Olivais
 Viscount of Olival
 Viscount of Oliveira
 Viscount of Oliveira do Conde
 Viscount of Oliveira do Douro
 Viscount of Oliveira do Paço
 Viscount of Oliveira Duarte
 Viscount of Orta
 Viscount of Ottolini
 Viscount of Ouguela
 Viscount of Outeiro
 Viscount of Ovar

P

 Viscount of Paço d'Arcos
 Viscount of Paço de Lumiar
 Viscount of Paço de Nespereira
 Viscount of Paiva
 Viscount of Paiva Manso
 Viscount of Palma de Almeida
 Viscount of Palmeira
 Viscount of Paradinha do Outeiro
 Viscount of Paredes
 Viscount of Parada Leitão
 Viscount of Passadiço
 Viscount of Passos
 Viscount of Pedralva
 Viscount of Pedroso
 Viscount of Pedroso da Silva
 Viscount of Pedroso de Albuquerque
 Viscount of Penalva de Alva
 Viscount of Penedo
 Viscount of Pereira
 Viscount of Pereira e Cunha
 Viscount of Pereira Machado
 Viscount of Pereira Marinho
 Viscount of Perném
 Viscount of Pernes
 Viscount of Peso da Régua
 Viscount of Peso de Melgaço
 Viscount of Picoas
 Viscount of Piedade
 Viscount of Pimentel
 Viscount of Pindela
 Viscount of Pinheiro
 Viscount of Pinhel
 Viscount of Pinto da Rocha
 Viscount of Podentes
 Viscount of Poiares
 Viscount of Pomarão
 Viscount of Ponte da Barca
 Viscount of Ponte de Santa Maria
 Viscount of Ponte e Sousa
 Viscount of Ponte Ferreira
 Viscount of Portalegre
 Viscount of Porto Covo da Bandeira
 Viscount of Porto da Cruz
 Viscount of Porto Formoso
 Viscount of Porto Marim
 Viscount of Porto Salvo
 Viscount of Portocarreiro
 Viscount of Povoença
 Viscount of Praia
 Viscount of Praia Grande de Macau
 Viscount of Prime
 Viscount of Proença Vieira
 Viscount of Proença-a-Velha

Q

 Viscount of Queluz
 Viscount of Quinta da Alegria
 Viscount of Quinta das Canas
 Viscount of Quinta de São Tomé
 Viscount of Quinta do Ferro

R

 Viscount of Real Agrado
 Viscount of Reboleiro
 Viscount of Rebordosa
 Viscount of Roboredo
 Viscount of Regaleira
 Viscount of Régua
 Viscount of Reguengo
 Viscount of Rendufe
 Viscount of Reriz
 Viscount of Reynella
 Viscount of Riba Tâmega
 Viscount of Riba Tua
 Viscount of Ribamar
 Viscount of Ribandar
 Viscount of Ribeira Brava
 Viscount of Ribeira de Alijó
 Viscount of Ribeira do Paço
 Viscount of Ribeiro da Silva
 Viscount of Ribeiro Magalhães
 Viscount of Ribeiro Real
 Viscount of Rilvas
 Viscount of Rio Claro
 Viscount of Rio Sado
 Viscount of Rio Seco
 Viscount of Rio Tinto
 Viscount of Rio Torto
 Viscount of Rio Vez
 Viscount of Rio Xévora
 Viscount of Rocha de Portimão
 Viscount of Rodrigues da Cunha
 Viscount of Rodrigues de Oliveira
 Viscount of Roriz
 Viscount of Rosário
 Viscount of Ruães

S

 Viscount of Sá da Bandeira
 Viscount of Sacavém
 Viscount of Safira
 Viscount of Sagres
 Viscount of Salgado
 Viscount of Salreu
 Viscount of Samodães
 Viscount of Sanches de Baena
 Viscount of Sanches de Frias
 Viscount of Sanchez
 Viscount of Sande
 Viscount of Sanderval
 Viscount of Santa Catarina
 Viscount of Santa Cruz
 Viscount of Santa Cruz do Bispo
 Viscount of Santa Eulália
 Viscount of Santa Isabel
 Viscount of Santa Luzia
 Viscount of Santa Margarida
 Viscount of Santa Maria de Arrifana
 Viscount of Santa Marinha
 Viscount of Santa Marinha da Trindade
 Viscount of Santa Marta
 Viscount of Santa Mónica
 Viscount of Santa Quitéria
 Viscount of Santana
 Viscount of Santarém
 Viscount of Santiago
 Viscount of Santiago da Guarda
 Viscount of Santiago de Cacém
 Viscount of Santiago de Caiola
 Viscount of Santiago de Lobão
 Viscount of Santiago de Riba de Ul
 Viscount of Santo Albino
 Viscount of Santo Amaro
 Viscount of Santo Ambrósio
 Viscount of Santo André
 Viscount of Santo António de Lourido
 Viscount of Santo António de Vessadas
 Viscount of Santo António do Vale da Piedade
 Viscount of Santo Elias
 Viscount of Santo Tirso
 Viscount of Santo Varão
 Viscount of São Bartolomeu
 Viscount of São Bartolomeu de Messines
 Viscount of São Bento
 Viscount of São Bernardo
 Viscount of São Boaventura
 Viscount of São Caetano
 Viscount of São Carlos
 Viscount of São Clemente de Basto
 Viscount of São Cosme do Vale
 Viscount of São Cristóvão
 Viscount of São Domingos
 Viscount of São Fins
 Viscount of São Gião
 Viscount of São Gil de Perre
 Viscount of São Januário
 Viscount of São Jerónimo
 Viscount of São João
 Viscount of São João da Madeira
 Viscount of São João da Pesqueira
 Viscount of São João Nepomuceno
 Viscount of São Joaquim
 Viscount of São Jorge
 Viscount of São Justo
 Viscount of São Laurindo
 Viscount of São Lázaro
 Viscount of São Lourenço
 Viscount of São Luís
 Viscount of São Luís de Braga
 Viscount of São Mamede
 Viscount of São Manuel
 Viscount of São Marçal
 Viscount of São Mateus
 Viscount of São Miguel Ângelo
 Viscount of Sâo Miguel de Seide
 Viscount of Sâo Paio dos Arcos
 Viscount of São Pedro do Rego da Murta
 Viscount of São Pedro do Sul
 Viscount of São Salvador de Matosinhos
 Viscount of São Salvador de Tangil
 Viscount of São Sebastião
 Viscount of Sâo Torquato
 Viscount of São Valentim
 Viscount of São Venâncio
 Viscount of São Veríssimo
 Viscount of São Vicente da Pena de Vilar
 Viscount of Sapucaí
 Viscount of Sardoal
 Viscount of Sarmento
 Viscount of Sarzedo
 Viscount of Schmidt
 Viscount of Seabra
 Viscount of Seisal
 Viscount of Semelhe
 Viscount of Sena Fernandes
 Viscount of Sendielos
 Viscount of Senhora da Ribeira
 Viscount of Sérgio de Sousa
 Viscount of Serpa Pinto
 Viscount of Serra da Tourega
 Viscount of Serra do Pilar
 Viscount of Serra Largo
 Viscount of Serrado
 Viscount of Setúbal
 Viscount of Sieuve de Menezes
 Viscount of Silho
 Viscount of Silva
 Viscount of Silva Andrade
 Viscount of Silva Carvalho
 Viscount of Silva Cota
 Viscount of Silva Figueira
 Viscount of Silva Loio
 Viscount of Silva Melo
 Viscount of Silva Monteiro
 Viscount of Silva Viana
 Viscount of Silvares
 Viscount of Silveira
 Viscount of Silves
 Viscount of Sinde
 Viscount of Sistelo
 Viscount of Soares Franco
 Viscount of Sobral
 Viscount of Sobreira
 Viscount of Socorro
 Viscount of Somzée
 Viscount of Sorraia
 Viscount of Sotomaior
 Viscount of Sousa Carvalho
 Viscount of Sousa da Fonseca
 Viscount of Sousa Prego
 Viscount of Sousa Rego
 Viscount of Sousa Soares
 Viscount of Sousel
 Viscount of Sousela
 Viscount of Soutelo
 Viscount of Souto
 Viscount of Souto d'El-Rei
 Viscount of Soveral
 Viscount of Stern
 Viscount of Sucena

T

 Viscount of Taíde
 Viscount of Tangil
 Viscount of Tardinhade
 Viscount of Taveiro
 Viscount of Tavira
 Viscount of Teixeira de Carvalho
 Viscount of Teles de Menezes
 Viscount of Telheiras
 Viscount of Tinalhas
 Viscount of Tojal
 Viscount of Tondela
 Viscount of Torrão
 Viscount of Torre
 Viscount of Torre Bela
 Viscount of Torre da Murta
 Viscount of Torre das Donas
 Viscount of Torre de Moncorvo
 Viscount of Torre do Terrenho
 Viscount of Torres (1850)
 Viscount of Torres (1883)
 Viscount of Torres Novas
 Viscount of Tortozendo
 Viscount of Tourinho
 Viscount of Tramagal
 Viscount of Trancoso
 Viscount of Treixedo
 Viscount of Trevões
 Viscount of Trindade

V

 Viscount of Valbranca
 Viscount of Valdemouro
 Viscount of Valdoeiro
 Viscount of Vale da Costa
 Viscount of Vale da Gama
 Viscount of Vale da Piedade
 Viscount of Vale de Remígio
 Viscount of Vale de Sobreda
 Viscount of Vale de Sobreira
 Viscount of Vale Flor
 Viscount of Vale Paraíso
 Viscount of Vale Pereiro
 Viscount of Valmor
 Viscount of Valongo
 Viscount of Vargem da Ordem
 Viscount of Várzea
 Viscount of Várzea da Ourada
 Viscount of Veiga Cabral
 Viscount of Veiros
 Viscount of Vela
 Viscount of Viamonte da Silveira
 Viscount of Vieira
 Viscount of Vila Boim
 Viscount of Vila Gião
 Viscount of Vila Maior
 Viscount of Vila Mendo
 Viscount of Vila Moura
 Viscount of Vila Nova da Rainha
 Viscount of Vila Nova de Cabanyas
 Viscount of Vila Nova de Cerveira
 Viscount of Vila Nova de Famalicão
 Viscount of Vila Nova de Foz Coa
 Viscount of Vila Nova de Gaia
 Viscount of Vila Nova de Ourém
 Viscount of Vila Nova de Souto d'El-Rei
 Viscount of Vila Nova do Minho
 Viscount of Vila Pouca
 Viscount of Vila Verde
 Viscount of Vilar de Allen
 Viscount of Vilarinho de São Romão
 Viscount of Vilela
 Viscount of Vinha Brava
 Viscount of Vinhais
 Viscount of Vinhal
 Viscount of Viomeril

W

 Viscount of Westheimer
 Viscount of Wildik
 Viscount of Wrem

X

 Viscount of Ximenez

Z

 Viscount of Zambujal

See also
 Portuguese nobility
 List of Dukedoms in Portugal
 List of Marquesses in Portugal
 Lists of Countships in Portugal
 List of Barons in Portugal

External links
Portuguese Aristocracy Titles in a Portuguese Genealogical site - Viscounts
Portuguese Aristocracy Titles in a Portuguese Genealogical site - Viscountesses

Portugal

Viscounts